"Chávez eyes" (Spanish: ojos de Chávez) is a design of stylized eyes of ex-president of Venezuela Hugo Chávez that has become pervasive throughout Venezuela among the supporters of Chávez, the Venezuelan government and PSUV that is primarily used as political propaganda for the Bolivarian government. The eyes have been seen on "billboards, T-shirts and buildings around the nation". Most of these buildings, shirts and more objects where the Chavez eyes are presented, are made from the government, in public projects planned by the current government. 
"Chávez eyes" first originated from Hugo Chávez's final presidential campaign in 2012, with the idea originating from José Miguel España, a member of Chávez's campaign. During an election gathering, thousands of Chávez supporters wore red shirts printed with his eyes in black.

The design was then widely spread by Chávez supporters. Following Chávez's death, Venezuelan president Nicolás Maduro adopted the emblem after coming to power, placing the eyes on "billboards, walls, and even the facades of public buildings". By 2015, Reuters described the "Chávez eyes" as "[t]he most ubiquitous image in Venezuela of recent years".

Uses

Elections

During the 2013 Venezuelan presidential elections, Maduro used the "Chávez eyes" design for his campaign. Chávez's image was used more than Maduro's own image, with "Chávez eyes" seen on buildings, T-shirts and posters.

The eyes have also been used by various Venezuelan politicians that support Chavez or claim to continue his works and projects.

State-owned facilities
In each new housing project built by the Venezuelan government, housing millions of Venezuelans in total, the emblematic eyes are also positioned throughout the complexes.

Following the 2015 Venezuelan parliamentary election, which installed an opposition majority in the National Assembly, the parliamentary body decided to have the Chávez eyes removed from the Federal Legislative Palace. Following the National Assembly's move, the Venezuelan government asked for muralists "to paint against censorship", with murals beginning to flood throughout Caracas.

Use by popular figures
At a Chávez tribute in November 2014, Pablo Iglesias Turrión, leader of the Spanish political party Podemos, was seen wearing a red shirt with the "eyes of Chávez" printed on it.

Analysis

According to a 2014 report titled Faces and Traces of a Leader. Hugo Chavez: Memory of a People by the Venezuelan government's National Center for History, the Chávez eyes are supposed to represent a "watchful and protective gaze" and present a feeling of transparency or trust related to the phrase "Look into my eyes when I'm talking". It was also noted that since Chávez was not physically present in Venezuela anymore, the Chávez eyes to Bolivarian government supporters represented an "omnipresent" Chávez, reminding voters of their "ideological commitment".

Some who experienced the work say that it instills a presence of Chávez, a sense that he is "always watching you" that has been compared to the Orwellian figure, Big Brother.

Censure 
After the 2015 Venezuelan parliamentary election, in 2016 when the Anti-Chavista National Assembly was installed in the Jose Maria Vargas building, which is controlled by the Anti-Chavista National Assembly, the building used to have the eyes of Chavez, meaning that the building was owned by someone who supported Chavez or simply the government putted it. After the installation of the opposition in the building, the eyes and all meaning of chavismo was replaced by the icon of the National Assembly.

See also
Big Brother
Bolivarian propaganda
Cult of personality

References

Hugo Chávez
Propaganda in Venezuela